The Swiss Association for Standardization or Schweizerische Normen-Vereinigung (SNV), French: Association Suisse de Normalisation, is in charge of Switzerland's international cooperation and acceptance in the field of standardization. It is a founder member of both ISO and CEN.

The Swiss Association for Standardization liaises between experts of standardization and users of standards.

External links 
 
 English home page

ISO member bodies
Standards organisations in Switzerland